Oliver Fox was the pseudonym of Hugh George Callaway (30 November 1885 – 28 April 1949), an English short story writer, poet and occultist, most well known for documenting his experiences in astral projection and lucid dreaming.

Fox had trained in electrical engineering and worked as an actor. He had first published his OBE experiences in The Occult Review (1920, 1923). These formed the basis of his book A Record of Out-of-the-Body Experiences, published in 1939. He was inspired by the experiences of Sylvan Muldoon.

Fox has been described as a theosophist.

Publications

Fox, Oliver (1920). The Pineal Doorway: A Record of Research. The Occult Review 31: 190-198.
Fox, Oliver. (1920). Beyond the Pineal Door: A Record of Research. The Occult Review 31: 251-261.
Fox, Oliver. (1923). Dream-travelling: Some Additional Notes. The Occult Review 38: 332-338.
Fox, Oliver. (1962 edition, originally published in 1939). Astral Projection: A Record of Out-of-the-Body Experiences. University Books.

References

1885 births
1949 deaths
Astral projection
English occult writers
English Theosophists
English writers on paranormal topics
New Age writers
Parapsychologists